Black Vulcanite is a rap group based in Windhoek, Namibia. The group was formed in 2013 by Mark Question, AlithatDude, and Okin. After they released their EP Remember the future in 2013, the group was featured on OkayAfrica and in the South African Rolling Stone. In 2015 the group won the award for Best Music Video at the Namibia Annual Music Awards (NAMAS).

References 

Namibian musical groups
Hip hop groups
Namibian hip hop
Musical groups established in 2013
2013 establishments in Namibia
Musicians from Windhoek